Dacrycarpus cumingii is a species of conifer in the family Podocarpaceae. It is found in Indonesia, Malaysia, and the Philippines.

References

The Gymnosperm DataBase 1969. 

cumingii
Least concern plants
Taxonomy articles created by Polbot